PLW may refer to:

Mutiara Airport (IATA Code PLW), an airport near Palu, Indonesia 
Pelaw Metro station (Tyne and Wear Metro station code PLW), a railway station in Gateshead, England
PLW Entertainment, an Australian music production company
Power League Wrestling, an American independent professional wrestling promotion